Giuseppe Maria Borgognini (1651–1726) was a Roman Catholic prelate who served as Bishop of Montalcino (1695–1726).

Biography
Giuseppe Maria Borgognini was born in Siena, Italy on 12 November 1651.

On 28 November 1695, he was appointed Bishop of Montalcino by Pope Innocent XII, the diocese being directly subordinate to the Holy See (Papacy).
On 4 December 1695, he was consecrated bishop by Ferdinando Cardinal d'Adda, Cardinal-Priest of San Clemente, with Francesco Gori, Bishop of Catanzaro, and Giovanni Battista Visconti Aicardi, Bishop of Novara, serving as co-consecrators.

He served as Bishop of Montalcino until his death in November 1726.

References

External links and additional sources
 (for Chronology of Bishops) 
 (for Chronology of Bishops) 

17th-century Italian Roman Catholic bishops
18th-century Italian Roman Catholic bishops
Bishops appointed by Pope Innocent XII
1651 births
1726 deaths